The Amarillo Metropolitan Statistical Area is a metropolitan area in the Texas Panhandle that covers five counties: Armstrong, Carson, Potter, Randall, and Oldham. As of the 2010 census, the MSA had a population of 249,881 (though a 2015 estimate placed the population at 262,056).

Counties
Armstrong
Carson
Potter
Randall
Oldham

Communities

Places with more than 100,000 people
Amarillo (Principal city)

Places with 1,000 to 15,000 people
Canyon
Claude
Panhandle
White Deer

Places with 500 to 1,000 people
Groom
Happy (partial)
Lake Tanglewood
Skellytown

Places with fewer than 500 people
Bishop Hills
Palisades
Timbercreek Canyon

Unincorporated places
Bushland
Goodnight
Umbarger
Washburn
Wayside

Demographics
As of the census of 2020, there were 268,691 people, 97,747 households, and 65,455 families residing within the MSA. The racial makeup of the MSA was 65.4% White (Non-Hispanic white 57.1%), 6.2% African American, 1.0% Native American, 3.2% Asian, 0.04% Pacific Islander, 9.6% from other races, and 14.0% from two or more races. Hispanic or Latino of any race were 29.0% of the population.

The median income for a household in the MSA was $37,671 and the median income for a family was $44,696. Males had a median income of $31,710 versus $22,686 for females. The per capita income for the MSA was $18,327.

See also
List of cities in Texas
List of museums in the Texas Panhandle
Texas census statistical areas
List of Texas metropolitan areas

References

 
Geography of Armstrong County, Texas
Geography of Carson County, Texas
Geography of Potter County, Texas
Geography of Randall County, Texas